Lake Buena Vista is a city in Orange County, Florida, United States. It is mostly known for being the mailing address for Walt Disney World—although almost all of the resort facilities, including all four theme parks, are physically located in the adjacent city of Bay Lake. It is one of two Florida municipalities inside the Reedy Creek Improvement District, which also contains Walt Disney World, the other being Bay Lake. The permanent residential population of Lake Buena Vista was 24 at the 2020 census.

Lake Buena Vista is part of the Orlando–Kissimmee–Sanford Metropolitan Statistical Area.

History

Chapter 67-1965 of the Laws of Florida, incorporating the City of Reedy Creek, was signed into law by Governor Claude R. Kirk, Jr. on May 12, 1967, the same day he also signed chapters 67-764 (creating the Reedy Creek Improvement District), also known as the Reedy Creek Improvement Act, and 67-1104 (incorporating the city of Bay Lake). It was located fully inside the Reedy Creek Improvement District. The city was controlled by Walt Disney Productions and allowed it powers that other area attractions had not had.

Chapter 69-1527, which became a law on July 3, 1969, without the governor's approval, redefined the city boundaries. The city was completely moved, taking over some land that had been part of the City of Bay Lake (and was given up by Chapter 69-836, which became a law the same day) and including some other land that had formerly been unincorporated. Soon after, the City of Reedy Creek was renamed to the City of Lake Buena Vista to better reflect its new location, through which Reedy Creek did not flow. "Buena Vista" comes from the name of the street in Burbank, California, where The Walt Disney Company is headquartered.

The Reedy Creek Improvement District had all the powers of the city and more, raising the questions of why cities needed to be incorporated inside it. Walt Disney's original plans for the site included at least one futuristic living area, a planned "community of the future". This was never built, but some of the ideas were incorporated into the EPCOT theme park and later Celebration, Florida. The only residents of the city are Disney employees and their immediate family members who live in a small community on Royal Oak Court, north of Disney Springs. From 1971 to 2022, the only landowners are fully owned subsidiaries of Disney, and rights-of-way for state and county roads.

Geography

Lake Buena Vista is located at  (28.377362, –81.521728).

Climate

The lake

Lake Buena Vista is a small body of water located east of the Buena Vista Golf Course, west of the crossing of State Road 535 and Interstate 4. The lake, which was called "Blake Lake" before its acquisition by Disney, was named for Buena Vista Street in Burbank, California, where Disney's corporate headquarters are located. Several Walt Disney Company business entities had names containing "Buena Vista", a Spanish phrase that means "good view".

In 2015, guide maps for the Disney Springs shopping, dining, and entertainment district started promoting Village Lake, which the district and Disney's Saratoga Springs Resort & Spa borders, as "Lake Buena Vista". The actual lake and the promoted lake are connected via a stream, which is crossed by a bridge linking Disney Springs' Marketplace area with Saratoga Springs Resort.

Demographics

As of the census of 2000, there were 16 people, 9 households, and 5 families residing in the city. The population density was 3.3 inhabitants per square mile (1.3/km). There were 11 housing units at an average density of 2.3 per square mile (0.9/km).

There were 9 households, out of which one had children under the age of 18 living with them, four were married couples living together, none had a female householder with no husband present. Four households were made up of individuals, one of whom was 65 years of age or older. The average household size was 1.78 and the average family size was 2.40.

The age distribution was two under 18, none between 18 and 24, three from 25 to 44, six from 45 to 64, and five who were 65 or older. The median age was 53 years. The male-to-female ratio was 1:1.

The median income for a household in the city was $39,375, and the median income for a family was $62,500. Males had a median income of $60,000 versus $38,750 for females. The per capita income for the city was $25,769.

Points of interest

 Walt Disney World Resort
 Typhoon Lagoon
 Disney Springs
 Lake Buena Vista Golf Course

Government and infrastructure

The Reedy Creek Improvement District has its Fire Department Emergency Services station in Bay Lake, near Lake Buena Vista.

Education
Lake Buena Vista is within Orange County Public Schools.

The only subdivision within Lake Buena Vista (Royal Oak Court) falls within the attendance zones of Sand Lake Elementary School, Southwest Middle School, and Dr. Phillips High School.

See also

Bay Lake, Florida
Reedy Creek Improvement District

Notes

References

External links

Information at Reedy Creek Improvement District website

 
Cities in Orange County, Florida
Company towns in Florida
Greater Orlando
Populated places established in 1967
Cities in Florida
Reedy Creek Improvement District
1967 establishments in Florida